Sadeqabad (also Romanized as Şādeqābād) is a village in Keraj Rural District, in the Central District of Isfahan County, Isfahan Province, Iran. At the 2006 census, its population was 22, in 4 families.

References 

Populated places in Isfahan County